Parasitic pneumonia is an infection of the lungs by parasites. It is a rare cause of pneumonia, occurring almost exclusively in immunocompromised persons (persons with a weakened or absent immune system). This is a respiratory infection that may or may not be serious.

There is a variety of parasites that can affect the lungs. In general, these parasites enter the body through the skin or by being swallowed. Once inside the body, these parasites travel to the lungs, most often through the blood. There, a similar combination of cellular destruction and immune response causes disruption of oxygen transportation.  Depending on the type of parasite, antihelmynthic drugs can be prescribed. 

The most common parasites involved:
 Ascaris
 Schistosoma
 Toxoplasma gondii

See also
 Pneumonia

References 
 

Pneumonia
Parasitic diseases